Neil Patrick Bennett (born 28 February 1958) is a former Australian politician.

He was born in Bundaberg and worked as an electrical fitter, mechanic and power station operator before entering politics. A member of the Labor Party, he served as secretary and treasurer of the party's Gladstone branch. In 1992 he was elected to the Queensland Legislative Assembly as the member for Gladstone. He served until 1995, when he was defeated by independent candidate Liz Cunningham.

References

1958 births
Living people
Members of the Queensland Legislative Assembly
Australian Labor Party members of the Parliament of Queensland